Moune or Mounes may refer to:

Mounes Abdul Wahab (born 1947), Lebanese disability rights activist
Mounes-Prohencoux, commune in France
Ti Moune, a major character in the Broadway musical Once on This Island